Taylor Drysdale (January 14, 1914 – February 9, 1997) was an American competition swimmer and swimming coach.  Drysdale represented the United States at the 1936 Summer Olympics in Berlin, Germany.  He competed in the men's 100-meter backstroke, and finished fourth in the event final with a time of 1:09.4.

Drysdale attended the University of Michigan, where he was a member of the Michigan Wolverines swimming and diving team in National Collegiate Athletic Association (NCAA) competition from 1932 to 1935.  During his college swimming career, he won three individual NCAA national championships in the 150-yard backstroke (1932, 1934, 1935), and was also a member of Michigan's NCAA-winning teams in the 300-yard medley relay (1932, 1935) and 400-yard freestyle relay (1935).

He later earned master's degrees in nuclear physics and mathematics from the University of Michigan, joined the U.S. military, worked on the Manhattan Project, and retired from the U.S. Air Force as a colonel.  He was also the manager of the 1956 U.S. Olympic swim team.

Drysdale was inducted into the International Swimming Hall of Fame as an "Honor Pioneer Swimmer" in 1994.  He died in 1997; he was 83 years old.

See also
 List of members of the International Swimming Hall of Fame
 List of University of Michigan alumni

References

External links
 
 
  Taylor Drysdale (USA)  – Honor Pioneer Swimmer profile at International Swimming Hall of Fame

1914 births
1997 deaths
American male backstroke swimmers
Michigan Wolverines men's swimmers
Olympic swimmers of the United States
Swimmers from Indianapolis
Swimmers at the 1936 Summer Olympics
Manhattan Project people
20th-century American people